Alexander Carter (born September 6, 1963) is a former American football defensive end who played for the Cleveland Browns of the National Football League (NFL). He played college football at Tennessee State University.

References 

1963 births
Living people
South Miami Senior High School alumni
Players of American football from Miami
American football defensive ends
Tennessee State Tigers football players
Miami Dolphins players
Cleveland Browns players
National Football League replacement players